In organic chemistry, an active ester is an ester functional group that is highly susceptible toward nucleophilic attack. Activation can be imparted by modifications of the acyl or the alkoxy components of a normal ester, say ethyl acetate. Typical modifications call for electronegative substituents. Active esters are employed in both synthetic and biological chemistry.

Reactivity
Active esters are mainly used as acylating agents. They undergo the same reactions as their unactivated analogues but do so more rapidly. They are prone to hydrolysis, for example.  Of great interest is the enhanced reactivity of active esters toward amines to give amides.

Examples
Thioesters are prominent active esters, as illustrated by the esters of coenzyme A.

In synthetic chemistry, active esters include derivatives of nitrophenols and pentafluorophenol. Active esters are often used in peptide synthesis, e.g., N-hydroxysuccinimide, hydroxybenzotriazole. Active esters of acrylic acid are precursors to polymers with reactive side chains.

The concept of active esters extends to esters of phosphoric and sulfuric acids. One such case is dimethylsulfate, a strong methylating agent.

References

Functional groups
Esters